
Gmina Widawa is a rural gmina (administrative district) in Łask County, Łódź Voivodeship, in central Poland.

The gmina contains part of the protected area called Warta-Widawka Landscape Park.

Villages
Gmina Widawa contains the villages and settlements of Brzyków, Chociw, Chrusty, Chrząstawa, Dąbrowa Widawska, Dębina, Górki Grabińskie, Goryń, Grabówie, Izydorów, Józefów Widawski, Kąty, Klęcz, Kocina, Kolonia Zawady, Korzeń, Las Zawadzki, Łazów, Ligota, Lucjanów, Ochle, Ochle-Kolonia, Osieczno, Patoki, Podgórze, Przyborów, Raczynów, Restarzew Cmentarny, Restarzew Środkowy, Rogóźno, Ruda, Sarnów, Sewerynów, Siemiechów, Świerczów, Widawa, Wielka Wieś A, Wielka Wieś B, Wincentów, Witoldów, Wola Kleszczowa, Zabłocie, Zawady and Zborów.

Neighbouring gminas
Gmina Widawa is bordered by the gminas of Burzenin, Konopnica, Rusiec, Sędziejowice, Szczerców, Zapolice and Zelów.

References
 Polish official population figures 2006
 Jewish history of Widawa

Widawa
Łask County